The 1910 All-Ireland Senior Football Championship Final was the 23rd All-Ireland Final and the deciding match of the 1910 All-Ireland Senior Football Championship, an inter-county Gaelic football tournament for the top teams in Ireland. 

Louth received a walkover, because Kerry refused to play after the Great Southern and Western Railway would not sell tickets to their fans at reduced rates.

References

Gaelic football
All-Ireland Senior Football Championship Finals
Kerry county football team matches
Louth county football team matches